The 2014 Liberal Democrats deputy leadership election began on 18 December 2013, when the incumbent Deputy Leader of the Liberal Democrats, Simon Hughes, was appointed Minister of State at the Ministry of Justice, and opted to resign his party position to focus on his new post.

The post was elected by and from the party's 55 Members of Parliament in the House of Commons, who voted on 28 January 2014. (57 Liberal Democrat MPs had been elected at the previous general election, but at the time of the vote, both David Ward and Mike Hancock had had the whip withdrawn.) Lorely Burt was seen as the front-runner, yet veteran MP Sir Malcolm Bruce, who had already announced that he would be standing down at the May 2015 general election, was elected as Deputy Leader on the second round of voting.

Candidates
Gordon Birtwistle, MP for Burnley since 2010.
Sir Malcolm Bruce, MP for Gordon since 1983, who had already announced that he would be standing down from the House of Commons at the May 2015 general election, which ensured that in the event of his election, another election would be prompted by his retirement sixteen months later.
Lorely Burt, MP for Solihull since 2005, and Parliamentary Private Secretary to Danny Alexander, was widely seen as the front-runner candidate.

Run-up to the election
The election coincided with the conclusion of Alistair Webster QC's report on the allegations of sexual harassment surrounding the party's former Chief Executive Lord Rennard, and in the weeks leading up to it, the party received extensive coverage surrounding sexual harassment claims against senior party figures including Lord Rennard, MP Mike Hancock, and AM William Powell.

Accordingly, numerous media commentators noted that it appeared highly likely the party would seek to offset criticism of its treatment of women by electing the frontrunner Burt as the party's first woman Deputy Leader, and after receiving 24 nominations, she was described as "the firm favourite". Consequently, some expressed surprise at Burt's defeat by Bruce, with the Daily Express branding the result "a blunder of Olympian proportions" which left the party open to accusations of being "pale, male and stale".

Result

Gordon Birtwistle was eliminated after the first round, and his second preferences were redistributed.

See also
2003 Liberal Democrats deputy leadership election
2006 Liberal Democrats deputy leadership election
2010 Liberal Democrats deputy leadership election

References

Liberal Democrat deputy leadership election
Deputy Leadership election 2014
Liberal Democrats deputy leadership election